Music for Civic Recovery Centre is the twenty-first solo studio album from British musician Brian Eno, released in 2000.

Track listing 
 The Quiet Club - 44:50

Overview
An Opal release, with no catalogue number, this title is only available from EnoShop.

The music on the album is taken from an Installation—a show featuring music and visuals—that took place at the Sonic Boom exhibition of the Hayward Gallery, London, in April–June 2000. The event, featuring over 30 other artists, was curated by David Toop.

Part of Eno's Quiet Club series of Installations, it combined 12 audio elements with 10 visual light-sculpture generative elements, which was, itself, part of a series of multi-dimensional generative music pieces using asynchronous CD players, carousel projectors and video monitors used in other Installation pieces.

In a conversation with Toop, Eno's view is of a quiet "recovery area" situated within a city area, a theory which he has spoken of since the mid-eighties; a "critically functioning public space", a (preferably) darkened room containing large-format screens, and many CD players and sculptures.

Eno has said of his Installations "I want to make places that feel like music. I want to make things which are like music for the eyes. I want to extend music out into space, into the three dimensions of space, and into colour".

The album contains only one track, which is based upon, and essentially an extended remix / melding of the tracks Ikebukuro, from his 1992 album The Shutov Assembly and Kites II & Kites III from his 1999 album Kite Stories.

The heavily treated, slowed-down vocals of the Kite Stories part are based on a Japanese ghost-story, Onmyo-Ji, by Reiko Otano and was read by Kyoko Inatome, a waitress from his favorite sushi restaurant.

Eno calls this process "composting" .... "...so many processings and reprocessings - it's a bit like making soup from the leftovers of the day before, which in turn was made from leftovers...", "some earlier pieces I worked on became digested by later ones, which in turn became digested again. The technique is like composting: converting what would otherwise have been waste into nourishment".

In that same year, 2000, Eno issued a limited-edition 2-CD album with Reiko Okano, Baku Yumemakura & Peter Schwalm called Music for Onmyo-Ji, the first CD of which consists of Japanese music played on traditional instruments.

Credits
 Music: Brian Eno
 Main Voice: Kyoko Inatome
 Translation: Charmian Norman-Taylor

A "Quiet Club by Brian Eno" Installation was held in the Galleria of Frankfurt Fair and Exhibition Centre, 18 to 24 April 2004, as the contribution of Light+Building 2004 to Luminale. The music was remixed each time by a different musician.

References

External links
 Images from Civic Recovery Centre by Odd Marthinussen
 Eno Land feature
 Interview; questions from the Sonic Boom Exhibition
 SlashSeconds feature on Quiet Clubs
 Beep discography entry
 Discogs.com entry

Brian Eno albums
2000 albums
Albums produced by Brian Eno